Alexis Maximiliano Machuca (born 10 May 1990 in Rosario) is an Argentine professional footballer who plays for Chilean side Deportes Concepción in the Segunda División as a defender.

Honours
Universidad de Concepción
 Primera B: 2013 Transición
 Copa Chile: 2014–15

External links
 
 
 Argentine Primera statistics

1990 births
Living people
Argentine footballers
Footballers from Rosario, Santa Fe
Argentina youth international footballers 
Argentina under-20 international footballers
Newell's Old Boys footballers
Universidad de Concepción footballers
Club Sportivo Estudiantes players
Gimnasia y Esgrima de Jujuy footballers
Santiago Morning footballers
Deportes Concepción (Chile) footballers
Argentine Primera División players
Primera B de Chile players
Chilean Primera División players
Primera Nacional players
Segunda División Profesional de Chile players
Argentine expatriate footballers
Expatriate footballers in Chile
Argentine expatriate sportspeople in Chile
Argentine expatriates in Chile
Association football defenders
People from Rosario, Santa Fe